Basirhat Dakshin Assembly constituency is an assembly constituency in North 24 Parganas district in the Indian state of West Bengal.

Overview
As per orders of the Delimitation Commission, 124 Basirhat Dakshin Assembly constituency is composed of the following: Basirhat municipality, Basirhat I community development block, and Taki municipality.

Basirhat Dakshin Assembly constituency is part of 18. Basirhat (Lok Sabha constituency).

Members of Legislative Assembly

Election results
2021

2016

2014 Bye-election
A bye-election was held on 13 September 2014 following the death of the sitting MLA, Narayan Mukherjee.

2011
In the 2011 election, Narayan Mukherjee of CPI(M) defeated his nearest rival Narayan Goswami of Trinamool Congress.

As per 2011 census total population of Basirhat Dakshin is 335130,Hindu 183256,Muslim 151180,Other 694.Hindu 54.682%,Muslim 45.111%,Other 0.207%.

1977-2006 Basirhat
During the period Narayan Mukherjee of CPI(M) won seven elections in a row from 95 Basirhat assembly constituency, defeating his nearest rivals Asit Majumdar of INC in 2006, Souren Sen of Trinamool Congress in 2001, Asit Majumdar of Congress in 1996, Dilip Mazumdar of Congress in 1991 and 1987, and Debi Prasad Nanda of Congress in 1982 and 1977.

1951-1972 Basirhat
Contests in most years were multi cornered but only winners and runners are being mentioned. Lalit Kumar Ghosh of Congress won in 1972 and 1971. A.B.Bandopadhyay of CPI won in 1969 and 1967. Bijesh Chandra Sen of Congress won in 1962. Profulla Nath Banerjee of Congress won in 1957 and in independent India's first election in 1951.

References

Assembly constituencies of West Bengal
Politics of North 24 Parganas district
Basirhat